Richard L. Cannady (born August 18, 1935, in Ottawa, Kansas) is an American politician and a former Republican member of the Wyoming House of Representatives representing District 6 from 2009 to 2017.

Education
Cannady graduated from Ottawa High School.

Elections
2012 Cannady won the August 21, 2012 Republican Primary with 1,163 votes (61.8%), and was unopposed for the November 6, 2012 General election, winning with 3,458 votes.
2008 When Republican Representative Dave Edwards retired and left the District 6 seat open, Cannady won the August 19, 2008 Republican Primary with 881 votes (56.4%), and won the three-way November 4, 2008 General election with 2,091 votes (49.1%) against Democratic nominee Chase Anfinson and Independent candidate Tom Strock.
2010 Cannady won the August 17, 2010 Republican Primary with 1,053 votes (46.4%), and was unopposed for the November 2, 2010 General election, winning with 2,774 votes.

References

External links
Official page at the Wyoming Legislature
 

1935 births
Living people
Republican Party members of the Wyoming House of Representatives
People from Glenrock, Wyoming
People from Ottawa, Kansas
21st-century American politicians